Slim Susie is a 2003 Swedish comedy-crime film. It was directed by Ulf Malmros and written by Malmros and Petteri Nuottimäki. It is considered Ulf Malmros's most popular film.

Plot
The film is set in a small industrial town in Värmland, where a young man returns to his hometown from Stockholm to investigate the sudden disappearance of his sister. He initially has little success with his inquiries, performed through the rekindling of brief acquaintances with the odd characters of his youth, and he eventually forms a picture of what has happened.

Cast
Most of the actors are amateurs, with Tuva Novotny, Kjell Bergqvist and Michael Nyqvist being the only ones of greater prominence. Björn Starrin and Lotta Tejle had their breakthrough in the film.

 Tuva Novotny as Smala Sussie (Slim Susie), the sister of Erik
 Jonas Rimeika as Erik, who moved away to Stockholm 3 years prior to the plot.
 Björn Starrin as Grits Pölsa, a wheeler and drugdealer interested in filmmaking and makes wine of garbage
 Kjell Bergqvist as Billy Davidsson, a local policeman
 Malin Morgan as Sandra, working in the pizzeria
 Lotta Tejle as Gudrun, Sussies coworker and a disgruntled wife
 Michael Nyqvist as Mörka Rösten ("the dark voice"), a police officer from Karlstad
 Lena Dahlman as Gerd, proprietor of the VCR cassette rental
 Johan Andersson as Micke Tretton (cf. The Piranha Brothers in Monty Python's Flying Circus)
 Anders Blomberg as Tore Tumör, the single father of a baby and mute; previously operated on because of a brain tumor
 Nicky Horn as Davidssons wife
 Bengt Alsterlind as Gunnar, the husband of disgruntled Gudrun
 Lena Wallman-Alster as Erik's mother, an alcoholic
 Rolf H. Karlsson as Cinemaoperator 
 Olle Wirenhed as Konsum-owner Ralf

Soundtrack 
 "Dirty And Cheap" Performed by Randy
 "No Right" Performed by Whyte Seeds
 "Billy The Coach" Performed by Leif Karate
 "Newfound Lover" Performed by Tuva Novotny
 "Stupid" Performed by Camela Leierth
 "Palace Station" Performed by Melody Club
 "Notes About Freedom" Performed by Act II
 "Live It Up" Performed by Papa Dee
 "X-Ray Eyes" Performed by Randy
 "Hip Teens" Performed by Frank Popp Ensemble
 "Slow Motions" Performed by Whyte Seeds
 "Say Oh Say" Performed by Isolation Years
 "No Place Like Home" Performed by Moses
 "In The Healing Rain" Performed by Travellers In Time
 "Perpetuum Mobile" Performed by The Penguin Café Orchestra
 "Dirty Tricks" Performed by Randy

References

External links 

2000s Swedish-language films
2003 films
2000s crime comedy films
2003 in Sweden
Swedish crime comedy films
Films set in Sweden
Värmland in fiction
Films directed by Ulf Malmros
2003 comedy films
2000s Swedish films